Hermann Smiel (31 July 1880 – 14 March 1956) was a German cyclist. He competed in two events at the 1912 Summer Olympics.

References

External links
 

1880 births
1956 deaths
German male cyclists
Olympic cyclists of Germany
Cyclists at the 1912 Summer Olympics
Sportspeople from Cottbus
Cyclists from Brandenburg
20th-century German people